Ronald David Bull (born February 2, 1940) is a retired American football running back. He played running back at Bishop High School in Bishop, Texas.

Bull played halfback at Baylor University. While at Baylor he played at the Gator Bowl against the University of Florida. He also played in the East–West Shrine Game, the Senior Bowl, and the College All-Star Game.

Bull was drafted in the 1962 American Football League Draft by the Dallas Texans with the team's first pick, but elected to play for the National Football League instead. Bull was taken out of the Baylor University by the Chicago Bears as the seventh pick in the first round in the 1962 NFL Draft. During his career, Bull played in 123 games, carried the ball 881 times for 3,222 yards and 9 touchdowns. He was named the 1962 Senior Bowl most valuable player and 1962 UPI NFL-NFC Rookie of the Year. Bull was among the inaugural inductees in the Texas High School Hall of Fame in 1985. He was also inducted into the Chicagoland Sports Hall of Fame in 2001.

He currently runs his specialty advertising business, Ronnie Bull Sales, Inc in the Chicago area.

External links
 Bull's stats

1940 births
Living people
People from Kingsville, Texas
Chicago Bears players
Philadelphia Eagles players
Players of American football from Texas
Baylor Bears football players